Sogabe is a Japanese surname that may refer to
, Japanese Olympic gymnast
, Japanese voice actor
, Japanese manga artist 

Japanese-language surnames